is a Japanese gag manga series, written by Masahiro Totsuka and with art by Saki Azumi, serialized in Hakusensha's seinen manga magazine Young Animal Island. It was previously serialized in the same magazine under the title  between 2012 and 2014, which was collected in two tankōbon volumes. A web anime series adaptation has been announced. The anime is directed by Akiko Seki with character designs by Erina Kojima and produced by Sakura Create. Online manga website Young Animal Densi in which Hakusensha simultaneously published the manga, began streaming the first two episodes of the anime on October 16, 2015.

Plot
The story follows everyday lives of a girl named Akomi Natsuki and her boyfriend Ponta Ninomiya. Ninomiya is a super idiot who has no redeeming qualities aside from having a very handsome face.

Characters

References

External links
Official website 
Anime official website 

2015 anime ONAs
2015 web series debuts
Japanese animated web series
Comedy anime and manga
Hakusensha franchises
Hakusensha manga
Seinen manga
Anime series based on manga